Prodiamesa is a genus of midges in the non-biting midge family (Chironomidae).

Species
P. cubita Garrett, 1925
P. olivacea (Meigen, 1818)
P. rufovittata Goetghebuer, 1932

References

Chironomidae
Chironomoidea genera